Nonalactone may refer to:

 δ-Nonalactone
 γ-Nonalactone